This is a sortable table of the approximately 1,376 townlands in County Westmeath, Ireland.

Duplicate names occur where there is more than one townland with the same name in the county. Names marked in bold typeface are towns, and the word Town appears for those entries in the Acres column.

Townland list

References

 
Westmeath
Townlands
Westmeath